"Relación" is a song recorded by Panamanian singer and songwriter Sech. The song was released on April 1, 2020 as the second single from his sophomore studio album 1 of 1, released a month later. It was written by the performer alongside its producers and Joshua Méndez and Ramses Herrera. The track was produced by Jorge Valdes and Miguel Andrés Martínez, better known as Dímelo Flow and Slow Mike. "Relación" became a top ten hit in Panama, Argentina and Spain as well as a very popular song on TikTok. In the United States, the track made it to the twenty-second position on the Bubbling Under Hot 100 Singles chart.

A remixed version of the song featuring vocals by Daddy Yankee, J Balvin, Rosalía and Farruko, was released on September 4, 2020. It achieved great commercial success, surpassing the chart success of the original song, reaching the top ten position in Argentina, Panama and Spain, among others, and peaked at number one in Mexico. In the United States, it entered the Billboard Hot 100, peaking at 64 and topped the Latin Airplay chart as well as reaching the second position on the US Hot Latin Songs one.

Background
Following the success of Sech's collaboration with Bad Bunny "Ignorantes", the Panamanian singer announced on March 30 that he would be releasing his new single "Relación" on the first of April as a new advance of his upcoming studio album. The song is about female empowerment, in this way, the song reflects again the spite and liberation of a woman in a failed relationship. A music video was uploaded on YouTube the same day the track was released in order to promote the song.

Commercial performance
"Relación" has been named one of the songs of the summer of 2020 by multiple magazines specially after the track became extremely popular on TikTok following a choreography designed by Spanish influencer Samuel López. The audio reached over four million uses on the app in August. Thus, the song entered the Top 50 global Spotify chart, reaching the number one spot on the national streaming lists in many Latin American countries, topping them in Bolivia, Costa Rica, Ecuador, Honduras, Panama and Perú while reaching the top ten in Argentina, Spain and Guatemala. "Relación" became the sixth most listened song in Spain during summer season.

Charts

Weekly charts

Year-end charts

Certifications

Remix

After the music video for "Relación" reached a hundred hits on YouTube in the beginning of July, Sech share his enthusiasm on Instagram stories as well as an audio where you could hear Colombian reggaeton star J Balvin sing "latino gang. remix". Later, Rosalía shared an Instagram story of herself at a recording studio in San Juan singing to the song's melody. On August 15, Rosalía posted on TikTok a short video of her at a recording studio alongside producer David Rodríguez where she also shared a preview of the song. On August 29, 2020, the painting of a mural started in Miami to promote the remix's release. Sech, as well as Rich Music, shared the construction of the artwork on their respective social media profiles, confirming the project and the participation of Daddy Yankee and Farruko in it. On September 2, the track was confirmed to be released that same Friday at noon.

Charts

Weekly charts

Year-end charts

Certifications

Release history

See also
List of Billboard number-one Latin songs of 2020

References

2020 songs
2020 singles
J Balvin songs
Daddy Yankee songs
Rosalía songs
Spanish-language songs
Songs written by Dimelo Flow
Farruko songs
Sech (singer) songs